Hangin' Up My Heart is the 1983 debut album of actress Sissy Spacek. The album produced three singles: "Lonely but Only for You", which reached number 15 on Hot Country Songs, along with "If I Can Just Get Through the Night" and "If You Could Only See Me Now".

Critical reception
An uncredited review in People magazine said that Spacek's "vocals are amazingly strong and sensuous". The reviewer also called it an "auspicious showing by an Oscar-winning actress who has a natural feel for this genre". Keith Tuber of Orange Coast magazine was also positive, writing that the title track "erases the initial feelings of mistrust, the kind that accompanies any singing work from a professional actress". Tuber also praised Rodney Crowell's production.

Track listing

Personnel
 Lee Allen - saxophone
 Barbara Bennett - backing vocals
 Richard Bennett - electric 12-string guitar 
 David Briggs - piano
 Rosemary Butler - backing vocals 
 Rosanne Cash - backing vocals
 Hank DeVito - electric guitar, steel guitar 
 Linda Dillard - backing vocals
 Vince Gill - acoustic guitar, electric guitar, backing vocals
 Johnny Gimble - fiddle, mandolin 
 Emory Gordy, Jr. - bass, acoustic guitar
 John Hobbs - piano, synthesizer
 Larry London - drums 
 Tommy Morgan - harmonica 
 Reggie Young - electric guitar 
 Sissy Spacek - vocals

Chart performance

Album

Singles

References

1983 debut albums
Sissy Spacek albums
Atlantic Records albums
Albums produced by Rodney Crowell